Kanwar Virdi (born 11 February 1969) is an Indian former cricketer. He played seven first-class matches for Haryana between 1988 and 1990. He was also part of India's squad for the 1988 Youth Cricket World Cup.

References

External links
 

1969 births
Living people
Indian cricketers
Haryana cricketers
Place of birth missing (living people)